The FIRS Roller Hockey World Cup U-20 is a biennial international competition for men's under-20 national roller hockey teams organized by the Fédération Internationale de Roller Sports (FIRS) since 2003. It takes place every two years and it was organized by the FIRS until its integration into World Skate in 2017 and is now part of the World Roller Games.

The current champions are Argentina, who secured their second title after beating Italy 4-1 in the 2022 edition's final.

History

Medal table

See also
Roller Hockey World Cup
Women's Roller Hockey World Cup

References

 
Hockey, U20
Recurring sporting events established in 2003
Roller, U20